A gentleman thief, gentleman burglar, lady thief, or phantom thief is a stock character in fiction. A gentleman or lady thief is characterised by impeccable manners, charm, courteousness, and the avoidance of physical force or intimidation to steal, and often has inherited wealth. They steal not only to gain material wealth but also for the thrill of the act itself, which is often combined in fiction with correcting a moral wrong, selecting wealthy targets, or stealing only particularly rare or challenging objects.

In fiction

In fiction, the gentleman thief is typically superb at stealing while maintaining a gentleman's manners and a code of honour. For example, A. J. Raffles steals only from other gentlemen (and occasionally gives the object away to a good cause); Arsène Lupin steals from the rich who do not appreciate their art or treasures and redistributes it; Saint Tail steals back what was stolen or taken dishonestly or rights the wrongs done to the innocent by implicating the real criminals; Sly Cooper and his gang steal from other thieves and criminals.

Gentlemen/lady thieves
Notable gentlemen thieves and lady thieves in Western popular culture include the following:

 A. J. Raffles, and his accomplice Bunny Manders, from the Raffles stories by E. W. Hornung, created in 1898. 
 Arsène Lupin, created by Maurice Leblanc in 1905.
 M. Hercule Flambeau from the Father Brown short stories by G. K. Chesterton, introduced in 1910.
 Jimmie Dale, also known as The Gray Seal, from the series of stories by Frank L. Packard, created in 1914.
 Filibus, an air pirate in the 1915 adventure film Filibus, is a phantom thief in the tradition of Arsène Lupin, carrying out heists for the thrill of it.
 Simon Templar, also known as "The Saint" from the novels and short stories by Leslie Charteris, created in 1928.
 The Robber (unnamed) in Jewel Robbery  (1932).
 Bugs Bunny in Looney Tunes, introduced in 1940.
 Selina Kyle, also known as Catwoman, from the Batman comic books, introduced in 1940.
 Oswald Cobblepot, also known as The Penguin, from the Batman comic books, introduced in 1941.
 Rick Blaine from Casablanca in 1942.
 Jim Craddock, also known as Gentleman Ghost, from the DC Comics universe, introduced in 1947.
 John Robie in Alfred Hitchcock's To Catch a Thief (1955).
 Danny Ocean from the film Ocean's 11 (1960) and the Ocean's Trilogy (2001–2007).
 Jimmy Bourne in The Happy Thieves (1961).
 Sir Charles Litton, also known as "The Phantom" in The Pink Panther (1963).
 Thomas Hewett Edward Cat from the TV series T.H.E. Cat (1966–1967).
 Thomas Crown from The Thomas Crown Affair (1968).
 Sir Oliver from the Alan Ford comics, created in 1969.
 Captain Feeney in Barry Lyndon (1975).
 Edward Pierce from The Great Train Robbery (1975).
 Miss Eula Goodnight from Rooster Cogburn (1975).
 Bernie Rhodenbarr, narrator of a novel series by Lawrence Block, created in 1977.
 Felicia Hardy, also known as Black Cat, from the Spider-Man comics, introduced in 1979.
 René Belloq in Raiders of the Lost Ark (1981).
 Carmen Sandiego, the title character from the Carmen Sandiego franchise, created in 1985.
 Hans Gruber in Die Hard (1988).
 Walter Donovan in Indiana Jones and the Last Crusade (1989).
 Remy Etienne LeBeau, also known as Gambit, from the X-Men comics, introduced in 1990.
 Dr. Eggman in Sonic the Hedgehog, introduced in 1991.
 Dr. Neo Cortex in Crash Bandicoot, introduced in 1996.
 Garrett, the Master Thief in Thief series of games (1998-2004).
 Scipio Massimo in Cornelia Funke's The Thief Lord (2000).
 Viper and also Valmont from the animated Jackie Chan Adventures (2000–2005).
 The Toy Taker, aka Mr. Cuddles from Rudolph the Red-Nosed Reindeer and the Island of Misfit Toys (2001).
 Sly Cooper, created in 2002.
 The Hacker from Cyberchase, created in 2002.
 Jack Sparrow from Pirates of the Caribbean franchise (2003).
 Moist von Lipwig from Terry Pratchett's Discworld novels; he is the main character of Going Postal (2004), Making Money (2007), and Raising Steam (2015).
 R.J. in Over the Hedge (2006).
 Locke Lamora from Scott Lynch's The Gentleman Bastard Sequence, created in 2006.
 Irina Spalko in Indiana Jones and the Kingdom of the Crystal Skull (2008).
 Neal Caffrey in the television series White Collar (2009–2014).
 David Goldman in An Education (2009).
 Lady Christina de Souza from the Doctor Who episode "Planet of the Dead" (2009).
 Pierre Despereaux, a recurring character in the television series Psych, portrayed by Cary Elwes, introduced in its fourth season in 2009.
 Kasumi Goto from the Mass Effect video game series, introduced in 2010. Her name approximately translates to "phantom thief."
 Flynn Rider in Tangled (2010).
 Gru in Despicable Me (2010).
 Megamind in Megamind (2010).
 Michael De Santa and Devin Weston in Grand Theft Auto V (2013).
 The Four Horsemen; Dylan Rhodes, Henley Reeves, J. Daniel Atlas, Jack Wilder, Lula, and Merrit McKinney in Now You See Me duology (2013-2016)
 Surly Squirrel in The Nut Job (2014).
 Constantine the Frog in Muppets Most Wanted (2014).
 Josiah Trelawny in Red Dead Redemption II (2018).
 Nolan Booth in Red Notice (2021).
 Loba Andrade, a playable character from the game Apex Legends, introduced in its fifth season in Spring 2021.
 Diane Foxington, Mr. Snake, Ms. Tarantula, and Mr. Wolf in The Bad Guys (2022).

Phantom thieves
 is the term for the gentleman/lady thief in Japanese media such as anime and manga. It draws inspiration from Arsène Lupin and elements in other crime fictions and detective fictions.

Notable phantom thieves in Japanese popular culture include the following:

 Arsène Lupin III, from Lupin III (by Monkey Punch, the grandson of Arsène Lupin, according to his creator),  created in 1967.
 The Kisugi sisters (Hitomi, Rui and Ai) from the manga and anime series Cat's Eye, introduced in 1981.
 Kaito Kuroba, also known as the "Kaitō Kid", the main character of Magic Kaito and a recurring character in Detective Conan by Gosho Aoyama, created in 1987.
 Kaitō Shinshi, the lady thief in The Kindaichi Case Files,  introduced in 1992.
 Meimi Haneoka, who transforms into Saint Tail, a phantom thief with acrobatic and magician skills, from Saint Tail by Megumi Tachikawa; created in 1995.
 Dark Mousy the angel-like phantom thief from D.N.Angel by Yukiru Sugisaki, introduced in 1997.
 Henry Agata (Hikaru Agata) A.K.A. Phantom Renegade (Kaito Retort) from Medabots, introduced in 1997.
 Kamikaze Kaitō Jeanne, the title character in Phantom Thief Jeanne, created in 1998.
 Clara, better known as the phantom thief Psiren, an exclusive character from the anime adaptation of the manga Fullmetal Alchemist, created in 2003.
 Keith Harcourt / Black Rose, from Ashita no Nadja, created in 2003.
 Bleublanc, also known as Phantom Thief B, from the Trails series, introduced in 2004.
 Jack, also known as Joker, the title character from the anime and manga Mysterious Joker who sometimes works with other phantom thieves in the series, created in 2007.
 Riko Mine Lupin IV of Hidan no Aria, the great granddaughter of Arsène Lupin. Allegedly, she is the child of Arsène Lupin III and Fujiko Mine, whom her surnames are derived from; introduced in 2008.
 Daiki Kaitō, portrayed by Kimito Totani, a character who can transform into Kamen Rider Diend from 2009 Kamen Rider Decade.
 Arsène, Rat, Twenty, and Stone River comprise the Thieves' Empire (Kaitou Teikoku) in Tantei Opera Milky Holmes, created in 2010.
 Loser, from Dimension W, introduced in 2011.
 Raphael/Ralph, also known as the Phantom R, the main character of Rhythm Thief & the Emperor's Treasure, created in 2012.
 Danjuro Tobita, also known as the "Gentle Criminal", from the anime and manga series My Hero Academia, introduced in 2014.
 Joker, from Persona 5, created in 2016.
Count night from Beyblade Burst Cho-Z created in 2018.
 The Lupinrangers in Kaitou Sentai Lupinranger VS Keisatsu Sentai Patranger, created in 2018.
 The Phantomirage in Secret × Warrior Phantomirage!, created in 2019.
 Laurent Thierry, a con artist in Great Pretender, introduced in 2020.

In real life

 Charles Earl Boles (b. 1829; d.after 1888), known as Black Bart, was an English-born outlaw noted for the poetic messages he left behind after two of his robberies. Considered a gentlemanly bandit with a reputation for style and sophistication, he was one of the most notorious stagecoach robbers to operate in and around Northern California and southern Oregon during the 1870s and 1880s.
 Willie Sutton, a gentleman bank robber of the 1920s who never harmed a person during his robberies and carried only unloaded weapons during the heists.
 D. B. Cooper, the only unidentified hijacker in American aviation history, who, in 1971, extorted $200,000 from an airline before parachuting out of a plane during the cover of night. A flight attendant described him as calm, polite, and well-spoken, not at all consistent with the stereotypes (enraged, hardened criminals or "take-me-to-Cuba" political dissidents) popularly associated with air piracy at the time. Another flight attendant agreed: "He wasn't nervous," she told investigators. "He seemed rather nice. He was never cruel or nasty. He was thoughtful and calm all the time." He ordered a bourbon and water, paid his drink tab (and attempted to give a flight attendant the change), and offered to request meals for the flight crew during the stop in Seattle.
 Vjeran Tomic, an art thief from France involved in the 2010 heist of the Musée d'Art Moderne de la Ville de Paris, taking paintings worth about $110 million, and various other heists of wealthy painting owners in Paris.

See also
 Gentleman detective

References

Further reading

External links
 The Saint and Leslie Charteris

Anime and manga terminology
Stock characters
 
Film genres
Mystery novels
Gentry